Mike or Michael Regan may refer to:

 Mike Regan (baseball) (1887–1961), American Major League Baseball pitcher
 Mike Regan (lacrosse) (born 1978), American retired lacrosse player
 Mike Regan (politician) (born 1961), American politician in Pennsylvania
 Michael Regan (British Army officer) (born 1942), British Army officer
 Michael Regan (Australian politician) (born 1974), Australian politician
 Michael S. Regan (born 1976), American government official

See also
 Michael Reagan (disambiguation) 
 Michael Regin, Indian professional footballer